Collège Béliveau is a Grade 7 to 12 French immersion school with 35 teachers serving approximately 600 students. It was the first French immersion centre in Western Canada after its conversion from English in 1982.

Notable alumni
Riley Cote, professional ice hockey player
Wab Kinew, Leader of the NDP Party of Manitoba
Mike Ridley, professional ice hockey player

Feeder schools 
Collège Béliveau draws its population from five schools: École Guyot, École Henri-Bergeron, École Howden, École Van Belleghem, and École Provencher.

References 

High schools in Winnipeg
French-language schools in Manitoba
Educational institutions in Canada with year of establishment missing

Saint Boniface, Winnipeg